Vietnam hosted and took part in the 2003 Southeast Asian Games in Hanoi from 5–13 December 2003.

The host Vietnam performance was its best ever yet in Southeast Asian Games history and emerged as overall champion of the games.

2003
Southeast Asian Games
2003 in Vietnamese sport
Nations at the 2003 Southeast Asian Games